Joachim III the Magnificent (30 January 1834 – 26 November 1912) was Ecumenical Patriarch of Constantinople from 1878 to 1884 and from 1901 to 1912.

Joachim was born in Istanbul in 1834, with Aromanian origin from Kruševo. He was educated in Vienna. In 1858-1861, he was the deacon in the holy temple of St George. In 1864, he was elected bishop of Varna and in 1874 bishop of Thessalonica In the time of his first reign, he worked on the improvement of the financial state of the Patriarchate. In 1880, he founded the magazine Truth and did various other charitable acts. He is seen as one of the most prominent and important patriarchs of the twentieth century and modern times.

Joachim  repeatedly attempted to find a solution to the Bulgarian schism, to little avail. Patriarch Joachim was a Mason, a member of the «Πρόοδος» lodge. He was awarded the Serbian Order of the Cross of Takovo and the Austro-Hungarian Order of St. Stephen.

References

External links
Joachim III of Constantinople -orthodox wiki
Website of the Ecumenical Patriarchate

1834 births
1912 deaths
People from Kruševo
Aromanian people
Aromanians from the Ottoman Empire
Aromanian priests
Ottoman Thessalonica
Bishops of Thessaloniki
 
19th-century Ecumenical Patriarchs of Constantinople
20th-century Ecumenical Patriarchs of Constantinople
Ottoman expatriates in Austria-Hungary
 
Clergy from Istanbul
People from Sarıyer